Kali Basti is a 1985 Indian Hindi-language film directed by Sudesh Issar and produced by Satish Khanna. It stars Shatrughan Sinha and Reena Roy in pivotal roles.

Cast
 Shatrughan Sinha as Karan Singh
 Reena Roy as Lajjo 
 Vijayendra Ghatge as Inspector Raghuvanshi
 Prem Chopra as Kuber 
 Sujit Kumar as Police Inspector
 Om Prakash as Peter Pereira

Soundtrack
Lyrics: Anjaan

References

External links

1980s Hindi-language films
1985 films
Films scored by Laxmikant–Pyarelal